Aliabad (also Romanized as ‘Alīābād) is a village in Moshkabad Rural District, in the Central District of Arak County, Markazi Province, Iran. At the 2006 census, its population was 168, in 41 families.

References 

Populated places in Arak County